Mordellistena semiusta is a species of beetle in the genus Mordellistena of the family Mordellidae. It was described by John Lawrence LeConte in 1862.

References

Beetles described in 1862
semiusta
Taxa named by John Lawrence LeConte